Pacific Highway is a  national highway and major transport route along the central east coast of Australia, with the majority of it being part of Australia's Highway 1. The highway and its adjoining Pacific Motorway between Brisbane and Brunswick Heads and Pacific Motorway between Sydney and Newcastle links the state capitals of Sydney in New South Wales with Brisbane in Queensland, approximately paralleling the Tasman Sea and the Coral Sea of the South Pacific Ocean coast, via regional cities and towns like Gosford (Central Coast NSW), Newcastle, Taree, Port Macquarie, Kempsey, Coffs Harbour, Grafton, Ballina, Byron Bay, Tweed Heads and the Gold Coast, which is part of Queensland. Additionally, between Brunswick Heads and Port Macquarie (excepting for a short stretch around Coffs Harbour), the road is also signed as Pacific Motorway, but has not been legally gazetted as such.

Pacific Highway no longer includes former sections of the highway between Brunswick Heads and Brisbane that have been legally renamed. As such, the highway stops short of the Queensland border near the Gold Coast. It is one of the busiest highways in Australia and was reconstructed as a controlled-access highway (motorway) and limited-access road (dual carriageway) standards between Hexham and the Queensland border between 1996 and December 2020, excepting a portion of remnant surface road around Coffs Harbour, with major construction of the Coffs Harbour Bypass expected to commence in 2023.

Route

Pacific Highway can be broken into the following sections:
 Brisbane to New South Wales / Queensland border: completely replaced by Pacific Motorway
 New South Wales / Queensland border to Brunswick Heads: upgraded to motorway-standard as part of the 1996 Upgrade Masterplan and renamed Pacific Motorway in 2013
 Brunswick Heads to Hexham: conversion to dual carriageway or freeway standards completed in 2020, as part of the 1996 Upgrade Masterplan.
 Hexham to Wahroonga: replaced by Pacific Motorway (also known as Sydney–Newcastle Freeway and formerly the F3 Freeway) as the national route between Wahroonga and Beresfield in sections between 1965 and 1993.
 Wahroonga to Sydney CBD: divided metropolitan road, formerly a Metroad route; the route via M2 (Lane Cove Tunnel and M2 Hills Motorway) and NorthConnex as a motorway alternative.

Pacific Highway passes through some of Australia's fastest growing regions, the NSW's Central Coast and North Coast and also the Brisbane-Gold Coast corridor, with tourism and leisure being the primary economic activity. Hence the traffic is heavy, particularly during holiday seasons, resulting in major congestion. For direct Sydney–Brisbane travel, New England Highway is an alternative that passes through fewer major towns and carries less local traffic. Another alternative route is via the scenic Bucketts Way and Thunderbolts Way to the Northern Tablelands at Walcha before rejoining New England Highway at Uralla.

Major cities and towns along Pacific Highway include: Gosford, Wyong, Newcastle, Taree, Port Macquarie, Kempsey, Coffs Harbour, Grafton, Ballina and Byron Bay, all in New South Wales; and Gold Coast in Queensland.

Major river crossings include the Hawkesbury, Hunter, Myall (just to the east of Bulahdelah), Manning (south of Coopernook), Hastings (west of Port Macquarie), Macleay (just to the east of Frederickton), Nambucca (near Macksville), Bellinger (near Raleigh), Clarence (via the Harwood Bridge near Maclean), Richmond (at Ballina), Brunswick, and Tweed rivers.

Sydney to Kariong
From Sydney, Pacific Highway starts as the continuation of Bradfield Highway at the northern end of the Sydney Harbour Bridge, immediately north of the Sydney central business district and is the main route as far as the suburb of Wahroonga. From the Harbour Bridge to Gore Hill Freeway at Artarmon, no route number has been assigned, and from Gore Hill Freeway to Wahroonga, the Pacific Highway is designated route A1. When the Warringah Freeway was built in the late 1960s, southbound traffic was diverted through North Sydney via Mount Street. In October 1985 it was again diverted via Berry Street.

From Wahroonga, Pacific Highway is mostly parallel to the freeway until Kariong (at which point it diverts into the Central Coast through Gosford and Wyong). The section of the highway from Cowan to Kariong follows a scenic winding route with varying speed limits, typically .

Kariong to Hexham
The section of what was formerly Pacific Highway from Wiseman's Ferry Road junction at Kariong, through to Pacific Highway exit at Gosford (adjacent to Brian McGowan Bridge), has been redeclared as Central Coast Highway with route number A49. Then the highway continues north without a route number through the Central Coast suburbs of Ourimbah and Wyong as a regional route before meeting with a spur of Pacific Motorway near Doyalson numbered as route A43. At this point Pacific Highway is signed route A43 for most of its length, and is a four-lane regional highway passing Lake Macquarie and on through the suburbs of the cities of Lake Macquarie and Newcastle before rejoining route A1 at Hexham.

From Bennetts Green to Sandgate it is supplemented by the Newcastle Inner City Bypass, through New Lambton and Jesmond. Two sections of the bypass, Bennetts Green-Rankin Park and Jesmond-Sandgate, are of motorway standard.

North of Hexham

From Hexham, Pacific Highway passes up the NSW north coast to Brunswick Heads where it becomes Pacific Motorway through to Brisbane.

Gazette definition
Pacific Highway used to be an undivided road from Sydney to Brisbane when it was first proclaimed. Since the most recent declaration of the highway in the April 2010 gazette, the New South Wales section of the highway is officially made up of four separate sections: Warringah Freeway, North Sydney to Gosford Interchange near Kariong; Henry Parry Drive, Wyoming to Pacific Motorway at Ourimbah Interchange; Wyong Road, Tuggerah to Hunter Street, Wickham; and Maitland Road, Warrabrook to the state border with Queensland. Since February 2013, the freeway section of the highway north of Brunswick Heads is also concurrently gazetted and is named and signposted Pacific Motorway. South of here, the section between Brunswick Heads and Bruxner Highway near Ballina is also signposted Pacific Motorway, however it is not declared as so in the gazette as of February 2019, therefore it remains as only Pacific Highway in the gazette. Confusingly, former sections of the highway removed from the gazette, such as between Gosford and Tuggerah, are still signposted as Pacific Highway.

Former sections 
Former sections of Pacific Highway were created when the sections were removed from the gazette definition, or were bypassed by new sections of Pacific Highway. However, as mentioned, some former sections of Pacific Highway that were removed from gazette definition continue to be referred and signposted as Pacific Highway.

Removed from gazette definition
Between Sydney and Hexham or Newcastle, some sections of the highway were re-gazetted as other roads and/or not gazetted as part of Pacific Highway anymore. However,  many of these are still referred to and signposted as Pacific Highway.

The first two sections of the highway to be removed from the gazette was the Calga to Kariong section and a section in Gosford between Racecourse Road/Etna Street and Brian McGowan Bridge in November 1996. The remaining section within Gosford, between Kariong and Brian McGowan Bridge, was re-gazetted and renamed Central Coast Highway in August 2006. These changes resulted in the previously undivided section between Ourimbah and Sydney to be split into two: Kariong to Sydney, and Ourimbah to Wyoming.

The April 2010 gazette removed the sections between Racecourse Road/Etta Street and Henry Parry Drive/Pemmel Street in Gosford, between Ourimbah and Tuggerah, and between Hunter Street and Industrial Drive in Newcastle from the existing declaration of the highway, but redeclared the section between Calga and Kariong. , this is the most recent gazette to redefine the declaration of Pacific Highway. Even though these three removed sections are not gazetted as part of Pacific Highway any more, street signage continues to show "Pacific Highway" and maps often show both the current road name and "Pacific Highway" together.

In Queensland, Pacific Highway used to go into Brisbane, however, most sections have been renamed to other roads or highways. For example, the section of Pacific Highway between Coolangatta and Currumbin is now part of Gold Coast Highway.

Bypassed
Sections of the highway between Hexham and the Queensland/NSW border that were bypassed and replaced by new sections of Pacific Highway, were renamed and downgraded to local roads, and are no longer part of Pacific Highway. As the new sections are just bypasses, this meant that the section between Hexham and Queensland border is still a continuous route. Prominent bypassed sections of the highway between Hexham and the border include:
the former  section Twelve Mile Creek and Taree through Stroud and Gloucester, with the new route over mostly dirt roads gazetted in 1952. The affected roads were upgraded over a number of years, including the construction of major bridges to replace the low level crossing at Nabiac and the ferry at Karuah. The upgrading of the northern section was completed first and through traffic ran temporarily over the road between Bulahdelah and Booral. The southern part from Bulahdelah to Twelve Mile Creek via Karuah was completed about 1960. The old section was later renamed Bucketts Way.
the former  section through Kempsey and Frederickton which included the site of the Kempsey bus crash. This section was replaced by a new freeway bypass and bridge over the Macleay River in 2013 and 2016, and was renamed the Macleay Valley Way.
the former  between Eungai Creek and Raleigh via Macksville and Nambucca Way. This section was bypassed in 2016 and 2018 and was renamed Giinagay Way
the former  section between Glenugie and Maclean via Grafton which included the site of the Grafton bus crash. This section was replaced by a new alignment of the highway in 2020 and was renamed Big River Way.

In May 2009, the portion of the Tugun Bypass (newly opened in June 2008) within New South Wales boundaries was declared as the new alignment of Pacific Highway between Tweed Heads interchange and the Queensland border. The  older bypassed alignment along Tweed Heads Bypass (opened 1992) towards the border at Coolangatta was gazetted as Gold Coast Highway instead, extending the already existing Gold Coast Highway in Queensland, into New South Wales. The Tugun Bypass was handed over to the NSW government in June 2018. The section of the bypassed highway within Queensland borders between Stewart Road and Gold Coast Highway was officially renamed Tugun-Currumbin Road, but is signposted as Stewart Road.

History

Initially, the primary mode of transport of the coastal areas between Sydney and Brisbane was by boat. From the roads radiating out from the port towns, the intervening hills were eventually crossed to create a continuous route along the coast, but this did not occur until the first decade of the 20th century. By contrast a continuous inland route from Newcastle to Brisbane via the Northern Tablelands had been in existence since the 1840s. A direct coastal route between Sydney and Newcastle was not completed until 1930, and completion of the sealing of Pacific Highway did not occur until 1958 (at Koorainghat, south of Taree). The last of the many ferries across the coastal rivers was not superseded by a bridge until 1966 (the Harwood Bridge across the south channel of the Clarence River – the north channel had been bridged in 1931).

Between 1925 and 1930 the then-Main Roads Board reconstructed a route between Hornsby and Calga that had been abandoned some forty years earlier, in order to provide a direct road link between Sydney and Newcastle. In addition a replacement route, from Calga into the gorge of Mooney Mooney Creek and up to the ridge at Kariong above Gosford, was also required. This new Sydney–Newcastle route via Calga and Gosford was some  shorter than the previous route via Parramatta, McGraths Hill, Maroota, Wisemans Ferry, Wollombi and Cessnock. At first Peats Ferry was reinstituted to cross the Hawkesbury River, with construction of the bridge not beginning until 1938, due to the Great Depression. Due to the onset of World War II, the Peats Ferry Bridge was not completed until May 1945.

The passing of the Main Roads Act of 1924 through the Parliament of New South Wales provided for the declaration of Main Roads, roads partially funded by the State government through the Main Roads Board (later the Department of Main Roads, and eventually Transport for NSW). Great Northern Highway was declared (as Main Road No. 9), running from North Sydney via Hornsby, Peat's Ferry, Gosford, Swansea and Newcastle to Hexham (still under construction), and North Coast Highway was declared (as Main Road No. 10), running from Hexham, Stroud, Gloucester, Taree, Port Macquarie, Kempsey, Coffs Harbour, South Grafton, Ballina, Byron Bay, Mullumbimby, and Murwillumbah to Tweed Heads, on the same day, 8 August 1928. With the passing of the Main Roads (Amendment) Act of 1929 to provide for additional declarations of State Highways and Trunk Roads, these were amended to State Highways 9 and 10 on 8 April 1929.

In Queensland, the main South Coast Road - originally built as a series of small roads linking the dairy and sugar farms south of Brisbane to the main railway line - was declared as Pacific Highway in December 1930. In New South Wales, a section of State Highway 9 (Great Northern Highway) from Hexham to Sydney, was re-declared as part of as State Highway 10; its entire length (including North Coast Highway from Hexham to the state border with Queensland, and the newly-added section of Great Northern Highway) was renamed Pacific Highway on 26 May 1931; Great Northern Highway was truncated to meet Pacific Highway at Hexham (and was later renamed to New England Highway in 1933).

Until the 1990s most road freight between Sydney and Brisbane passed along New England Highway instead, due to the easier topography of the Northern Tablelands it traverses. Between 1950 and 1967, traffic on Pacific Highway quadrupled due to the attraction of coastal towns between Sydney and Brisbane for retirement living and tourism.

Two major coach accidents on Pacific Highway in 1989 near Grafton (in which 21 people died) and at Clybucca near Kempsey (in which 35 people died) resulted in a public outcry over the poor quality of the road and its high fatality rate. Pacific Highway was never part of the federally funded system of National Highways. This appears to be because when the federal government funding of the 'national highway' system began in 1974, the longer New England Highway was chosen rather than Pacific Highway as the Sydney–Brisbane link, due to its easier topography and consequent lower upgrade costs.

In 1994, the Roads and Traffic Authority considered the environmental impact statement of a proposal for a toll road between Coolongolook and Possum Brush. The proposal was from Snowy Mountains Engineering Corporation Ltd and Travers Morgan Pty Ltd.

Until December 1997, a short  section of the highway between Ourimbah and Kangy Angy was used by Sydney–Newcastle Freeway traffic as there was no freeway alternative. This section of Pacific Highway was designated as part of National Route 1 and subsequently National Highway 1. It was also upgraded to dual carriageway in the early 1970s. Due to the shared freeway and highway traffic, the at-grade interchanges between the freeway and the highway at Ourimbah and Kangy Angy became bottlenecks during peak times. In December 1997, the Ourimbah Creek Road to Kangy Angy stage of the freeway, located 150 m west of the highway, opened to traffic. The new freeway section was one of the last sections of the freeway to be completed and was referred to as the "missing link" of the freeway. Pacific Highway was bypassed and reduced to one lane per direction, and the northbound carriageway and bridge over Ourimbah Creek north of Palmdale Road were removed. The at-grade interchange between the freeway and the highway at Kangy Angy was also removed.

The section of the highway from Cowan to Kariong follows a scenic winding route with varying speed limits, typically . This section was damaged quite severely during severe weather in June 2007. Five people died when a bridge over Piles Creek collapsed and the entire section was closed due to subsidence  further south. The road was reopened in 2009 when the Holt-Bragg Bridge was opened, named after the family that had perished.

The New South Wales section of Pacific Highway from Brunswick Heads to the state border with Queensland was re-declared as part of Pacific Motorway in February 2013.

The passing of the Roads Act of 1993 through the Parliament of New South Wales updated road classifications and the way they could be declared within New South Wales. Under this act, Pacific Highway today retains its declaration as Highway 10, across all four of its gazetted sections, from the state border with Queensland (via Pacific Motorway) to North Sydney.

Pacific Highway was signed National Route 1 across its entire length in 1955. With the conversion to the newer alphanumeric system in 2013, this was replaced with route M1 for sections classified as a motorway, and route A1 for sections classified as a highway (except between Hexham and Wahroonga, where it is designated route A43 through most of the Central Coast between Hexham and Doyalson, and route B83 between Kariong and Wahroonga).

1996 upgrade masterplan

Four lane dual carriageway standard upgrade

The highway was heavily used by interstate traffic and its upgrade was beyond the resources of the New South Wales government alone. The NSW and federal governments argued for years about how the responsibility for funding the highway's upgrade should be divided between themselves, only coming up with a mutually acceptable upgrade package just after the 1996/97 financial year.

As part of a joint New South Wales and federal funding arrangement and upgrade masterplan, single carriageway sections from Tweed Heads to Hexham were progressively converted to freeway or dual carriageway standards commencing in 1996. At the time, the plan targeted to have Pacific Highway upgraded to dual carriageway by 2016. The strategy divided the remaining sections into three levels of priority:
 Priority 1: Tweed Heads to Ballina, Port Macquarie to Hexham, Woolgoolga to Raleigh
 Priority 2: Raleigh to Port Macquarie
 Priority 3: Ballina to Woolgoolga

In the meantime, numerous sections of existing single carriageway road were upgraded by re-alignments and safety improvement work including the addition of overtaking lanes, pavement widening and median barriers. Overall the highway became safer and travelling times were substantially reduced, particularly during holiday periods..

The four lane dual carriageway upgrade of the highway was completed in December 2020. As of completion, about 15 billion have been invested in the upgrade by the federal and state governments, and fatalities have dropped by more than 75% since the upgrade started in 1996.

Coffs Harbour Bypass
The Coffs Harbour Bypass is a proposed  realignment of Pacific Highway that bypasses the city of Coffs Harbour, bypassing up to 12 sets of traffic lights. It will be built as a four lane freeway with three tunnels. It is the last section of the Pacific Highway Upgrade, and will be funded by the state and federal governments. The project was granted planning approval by the state government in November 2020 and the federal government in December 2020. Tenders for its construction were let in June 2022, with major construction expected to commence in early 2023 and completion expected in late 2026.

Motorway standard upgrade
The highway was upgraded to dual carriageway that is either an arterial standard (Class A) or a motorway standard (Class M). The Class M sections between Woolgoolga and Ballina are:
Thrumster to Eungai Rail
Congarinni to Boambee
Woolgoolga to Halfway Creek
Glenugie to Harwood
Woodburn to Pimlico

Following the dual carriageway upgrade, the only remaining project of the Pacific Highway Upgrade is the Coffs Harbour Bypass. Additionally, the M1 to Raymond Terrace project, which is classified as a separate project, will be a motorway extending and connecting the Pacific Motorway (Sydney to Newcastle section) to the upgraded Pacific Highway at Raymond Terrace. The M1 to Raymond Terrace project is currently in the planning stage and is expected to be completed by 2028.

Projects

Funding issues 
In 2007 mounting pressure was placed on the federal government to provide additional funding for the highway. On 10 October 2007 the Federal Minister for Transport and Regional Services pledged $2.4 billion in funding for the highway, subject to dollar for dollar funding by the NSW state government. However, the NSW state government refused to match funding. In the lead up to the 2007 federal election, then opposition leader Kevin Rudd pledged $1.5 billion in funding. As part of Auslink 2 (Nation Building Program), the federal government announced in its 2009 federal budget that $3.1 billion would be spent on the highway up until 2014 at which time just 63% of the highway would be duplicated. The NSW government will spend just $500 million over that same period, with $300 million cut as a result of the 2008 mini budget.

From time to time, there are proposals in the media for the private sector to build a fully controlled-access high-speed tollway between Newcastle and the Queensland border, possibly using the BOT system of infrastructure provision. Nothing eventuated from these proposals.

Other upgrades
Other sections of Pacific Highway (between Hexham and Sydney) have been upgraded or proposed to be upgraded:
 Since December 2020, the  section (Maitland Road) between Newcastle Inner City Bypass and New England Highway is being proposed to be widened from four lanes to six lanes.

Former route numbers
Pacific Highway was signed National Route 1 along its entire length in 1955. Over time, as road projects reallocated the route, or bypassed it entirely, these remaining sections were replaced with others. Former road routes of Pacific Highway have included:
 National Route 1 (1955–2013): –
 National Route 1 (1955–1988) /  State Route 111 (1988–2013): –
 National Route 1 (1955–1979) /  State Route 83 (1979–2013): –
 National Route 1 (1955–1993) /  Metroad 1 (1993–2013): –
 National Route 1 (1955–1992) /  State Route 14 (1992–1998) /  Metroad 10 (1998–2007): –
 National Route 1 (1955–1992): –

Safety 

The Pacific Highway was one of the most dangerous and deadly stretches of road in Australia, partly due to its high traffic levels. Between 1995 and 2009, over 400 people died on the highway. In 1989, two separate bus crashes, the Grafton bus crash (in which 21 people died) and the Kempsey bus crash (in which 35 died) on the highway were two of the worst road accidents in Australia's history. In 2010, 38 people died on Pacific Highway, and in 2011, 25 people. Over the past 15 years, the New South Wales Roads & Traffic Authority reports that about 1,200 people have been injured each year.

In January 2012, a ute swerved into the path of a B-double truck, which then veered off road and crashed into two houses at Urunga. 11-year-old boy Max McGregor, who was sleeping in one of the houses, and the ute driver died from the incident. Another seven people were taken to Coffs Harbour Hospital. It was found that the ute driver had a blood alcohol concentration of 0.245, five times over the limit and is equal to about 25 to 30 standard drinks. The section of the highway through Urunga was bypassed in 2016.

The undivided sections carried a high risk of head-on collisions. This was relieved to an extent by the provision of regular passing lanes, but these did not fully cope with the high level of traffic during holiday periods. After the 1989 crashes, the investigating coroner, Kevin Waller, recommended that the highway be fully divided along its entire length. Motorists surveyed by the National Roads and Motorists' Association (NRMA) voted Pacific Highway the worst road in New South Wales in 2012.

Major intersections

Between Pacific Motorway at Brunswick Heads in the north, and the highway's southern terminus at Bradfield Highway and Cahill Expressway in North Sydney, major intersections include:
 Ewingsdale Road (B62)
 Bruxner Highway (B60)
 Big River Way (B76) – towards Gwydir Highway
 Big River Way (B91) – towards Summerland Way
 Waterfall Way (B78)
 Oxley Highway (B56)
 New England Highway (A43)
 Nelsons Bay Road (B63)
 Parry Street (A15)
 Newcastle Inner City Bypass (A37)
 Sparks Road (B70)
 Central Coast Highway (A49)
 Motorway Link (A43)
 Cumberland Highway (Pennant Hills Road) (A28)
 Mona Vale Road / Ryde Road (A3)
 Gore Hill Freeway (M1)
 Lane Cove Tunnel (M2)
 Gore Hill Freeway (M1)
 Warringah Freeway (M1)

See also

 Highways in Australia
 List of highways in New South Wales

References

External links
 Pacific Highway Upgrade project page

 
City of Lake Macquarie
Newcastle, New South Wales
Port Stephens Council
Roads in the Hunter Region
Highways in New South Wales
Highway 1 (Australia)